Iron Ore Hill is a Canadian rural community in Carleton County, New Brunswick, 5 kilometers northwest of Woodstock.

History

The community is located on the slopes of Iron Ore Hill, named from deposits of iron ore and manganese located in the area. The deposit was discovered in 1836. Iron was mined near here from 1848 to 1884. A reported 70,000 tons iron ore was smelted during that time. The iron produced was transported to the Woodstock Iron Works to be smelted.

Notable people

See also
List of communities in New Brunswick

References

External links
 Moody Hill & Iron Ore Hill

Communities in Carleton County, New Brunswick
Mining communities in New Brunswick